Curacó Department is a department of Argentina in La Pampa Province.  The capital city of the department is Puelches.

References

Departments of La Pampa Province